Maple Street Memories is the thirtieth studio album by American country music group The Statler Brothers. It was released in 1987 via Mercury Records. The album peaked at number 9 on the Billboard Country Albums chart.

Track listing
"Our Street/Tell Me Why" (Don Reid, Harold Reid, Mitchell Parish, Michael Edwards, Sigmund Spaeth) – 8:10
"Maple Street Mem'ries" (Don Reid) – 4:16
"Deja Vu" (H. Reid, Don Reid, Debo Reid) – 2:32
"Am I Crazy?" (Jimmy Fortune) – 3:31
"The Best I Know How" (Kim Reid) – 2:55
"I'll Be the One" (Don Reid, Debo Reid) – 2:03
"Beyond Romance" (Fortune, John Rimel) – 2:54
"I Lost My Heart to You" (Fortune, Rimel) – 2:07
"Jesus Showed Me So" (H. Reid, Don Reid) – 2:29

Chart positions

References

1987 albums
The Statler Brothers albums
Mercury Records albums
Albums produced by Jerry Kennedy